De Profundis Clamavi Ad Te Domine (Latin for "From the Depths, I Have Cried Out to You, O Lord") is the first live album by black metal band Dark Funeral. It was recorded during the South American tour in September 2003, and was released by Regain Records on 18 April 2004.

Track listing

Personnel
 Lord Ahriman – guitars
 Emperor Magus Caligula – vocals
 Chaq Mol – guitars
 Matte Modin – drums
 Richard Daemon – bass guitar

References

Dark Funeral albums
2004 live albums
Regain Records live albums